is a city located in Wakayama Prefecture, Japan. , the city had an estimated population of 70,972 in 35076 households and a population density of 69 persons per km². Tanabe is the second largest city in Wakayama in terms of population, and the largest in the Kansai region of Japan in terms of area.

Geography
Tanabe is located the south-central Kii Peninsula and faces to the Pacific Ocean to the west and the Kii Mountains to the north and east. The coastline is intricate and forms Tanabe Bay. Tenjinzaki is at the northern end of the bay, and Shirahama is on the south side. The climate is moderated by the effects of the Kuroshio Current offshore.

Neighboring municipalities
Wakayama Prefecture
Shingū
Minabe
Inami
Hidakagawa
Shirahama
Kamitonda
Aridagawa
Kozagawa
Nara Prefecture
Totsukawa
Nosegawa

Climate
Tanabe has a Humid subtropical climate (Köppen Cfa) characterized by warm summers and cool winters with light to no snowfall.  The average annual temperature in Tanabe is 16.6 °C. The average annual rainfall is 2348 mm with September as the wettest month. The temperatures are highest on average in August, at around 26.5 °C, and lowest in January, at around 6.9 °C. The area is subject to typhoons in summer.

Demographics
Per Japanese census data, the population of Tanabe has decreased steadily over the past 40 years.

History
The area of the modern city of Tanabe was within ancient Kii Province. During the late Heian period to early Kamakura period, it was noted as the birthplace of Minamoto no Yoshitsune's companion, Benkei.  During the Edo period, it was part of the holdings of Kishū Domain ruled by a cadet branch of the Tokugawa clan through a hereditary karō based at Tanabe Castle. The town of Tanabe was established with the creation of the modern municipalities system on April 1, 1889. It merged with the neighboring town of Haya and attained city status on May 20, 1942. Tanabe continued to expand through annexation of neighboring municipalities: the villages of Inari, Shimaakizu, Maro in 1950, Shinjo in 1954, Nishi-Tonda in 1955, and the town of Muro in 1958.

On May 1, 2005, the village of Ryūjin, (from Hidaka District), the town of Nakahechi, the village of Ōtō (both from Nishimuro District), and the town of Hongū (from Higashimuro District) were merged into Tanabe.

Government
Tanabe has a mayor-council form of government with a directly elected mayor and a unicameral city council of 20 members. Tanabe contributes three members to the Wakayama Prefectural Assembly. In terms of national politics, the city is part of Wakayama 3rd district of the lower house of the Diet of Japan.

Economy
Tanabe is the main commercial center of central Wakayama Prefecture. Agriculture plays a major role in the economy, with production of umeboshi pickled plums, and the cultivation of various varieties of oranges and other citrus fruits predominant. Shiitake mushrooms, and the raising of poultry are also contributors. Commercial fishing and forestry play secondary roles.

Education
Tanabe has 25 public elementary schools and 15 public middle schools operated by the city government and five public high schools operated by the Wakayama Prefectural Department of Education.  The prefecture also operates one special education school for the handicapped, and one vocational education school.

Transportation

Railway
 JR West – Kisei Main Line
 -  -

Highway
  Hanwa Expressway
  Kisei Expressway

Local attractions 
 Kumano Hongū Taisha (熊野本宮大社), one of the Kumano Sanzan shrines
 Kumano Kodō and Ōmine Okugakemichi ancient pilgrimage roads, a National Historic Sites and World Heritage site
Cape Tenjinzaki, a preserved beach made of layered slabs of rock formation. The beach is submerged with water during high tides and revealed during low tides. It is also known as the birthplace of the Japan National Trust movement. Tenjinzaki Cape serves as a place of recreation and relaxation for citizens. People also enjoy fishing and shellfish gathering.
Ogigahama beach
Kawayu Onsen
Ryūjin Onsen
Loren Baker's Apartment
Kōzanji Shell Mound, National Historic Site
Misu-ji temple ruins, National Historic Site
Isoma Rock Shelter Site, National Historic Site

Festivals 
 Benkei Matsuri, a Yosakoi dance festival, featuring fireworks and dance performances by employees of local businesses as well as traveling dance groups, held in October.
 Tanabe Matsuri, a festival held at Tanabe's Tokei jinja shrine (闘鶏神社) in July.
 Ya-Ya Matsuri (August 8 Festival), a festival held to promote local shopping districts in downtown Tanabe City in August.

Sister cities 
 Tanabe was a sister city to Wyong Shire in New South Wales, Australia until 2010.

Noted people from Tanabe
 Morihei Ueshiba, the founder of Aikido.
 Tetsu Katayama, former Prime Minister of Japan
 Minakata Kumagusu, author and naturalist

References

External links 

 
 Tanabe City Kumano Tourism Bureau in English
 U.S. Air Force band performs in gratitude for 70 years of honoring fallen comrades Asahi Shimbun, October 21, 2014    Retrieved October 22, 2014
 

 
Cities in Wakayama Prefecture
Populated coastal places in Japan